Iru Kodugal is a 1969 Indian Tamil-language drama film directed by K. Balachander. The film stars Gemini Ganesan, Sowcar Janaki, Jayanthi, Nagesh, V. S. Raghavan, S. N. Lakshmi and others. The story revolves around one man who was married to two women. Iru Kodugal won the National Film Award for Best Feature Film in Tamil, the first film by Balachander to win the award. The film, which was based on a stage play of same name, was remade in Kannada as Eradu Rekhegalu, in Telugu as Collector Janaki and in Hindi as Sanjog.

Plot 
Gopinath (Gemini Ganesan) falls in love with Janaki (Sowcar Janaki) and they get married in Kasi. The marriage is not accepted by Gopinath's mother and the couple gets separated. Janaki is pregnant and her father (V. S. Raghavan), realising that no man will marry Janaki a second time, decides to make her a collector. Gopinath meanwhile had moved to South India, where he later married Jaya (Jayanthi) by hiding his previous marriage. They live a happy life with their three children and Jaya's father. Gopinath works as a clerk in the collector's office. A new collector arrives at the office, and it turns out to be Janaki. They tend to work together, until one of the employees in Janaki's office, Babu (Nagesh), spreads a rumour stating that there is an affair between Janaki and Gopinath. This rumour reaches Jaya and she is completely disturbed. Jaya discovers the secret of Gopinath's affair with Janaki. Meanwhile, the sons of both Janaki and Jaya, Ramu and Prabhakar drowned in water and have been admitted to Hospital. Somehow Jaya manages the disturbance of the secret and accepts Janaki as her sister. But Ramu dies in hospital while Prabhakar survives. Jaya gives Janaki her son as a gift. Janaki and Prabhakar leave for abroad as Janaki received her duty abroad.

Cast 
 Gemini Ganesan as Gopinath
 Sowcar Janaki as Janaki
 Jayanthi as Jaya
 Nagesh as Babu
 V. S. Raghavan as Janaki's father
 S. V. Sahasranamam as Jaya's father
 Harikrishnan as Harikrishnan
 S. Ramarao as Ramarao
 Gokulnath as Gnanaprakasham
 S. N. Lakshmi as Janaki's aunt
 Sachu
 Gemini Mahalingam
 Seshadri as Gopinath's father
 C. K. Saraswathi as Gopinath's mother
 Shoba as Shoba
 Sumathi as Sumathi 
 Master Prabhakar as Prabhakar
 Master Adhinarayan as Ramu

Production 
Iru Kodugal was based on the stage play of same name written by Joseph Anandan. It is the first collaboration between Balachander and Ganesan. Though uncharacteristic of Janaki to ask for roles, she asked Balachander for a role and got it. In a scene in the film Janaki's character meets the Chief Minister. Balachander wanted to bring in former Chief Minister C. N. Annadurai (he died 1969) for the scene but did not want to use a body double in his place. The Chief Minister is not seen in the scene, only a voice sounding like Annadurai's is heard and a pair of glasses on the table and a pen in the foreground are seen.

Soundtrack 
The music was scored by V. Kumar, and Vaali wrote the lyrics.

Release and reception 
Iru Kodugal was released on 2 October 1969. The Indian Express praised Balachander for adapting the play very well: "No doubt they are very good dramatic moments but there is tendency to overdo the symbolism" and went on to praise the performances of the lead actors. Malathi Rangarajan appreciated Janaki's performance "stomped the screen and stole our hearts [..] came up with a stellar performance". The film was a commercial success, and won the National Film Award for Best Feature Film in Tamil – President's silver medal in 1970, while Janaki won the Tamil Nadu State Film Award for Best Actress.

Legacy 
Iru Kodugal It was remade in Kannada as Eradu Rekhegalu, in Telugu as Collector Janaki and in Hindi as Sanjog. Clips from the film were screened along with clips from other films such as Server Sundaram (1964), Arangetram (1973), Aval Oru Thodar Kathai (1974), Avargal (1977) and Azhagan (1991) at a function held in Balachander's honour at Tiruchirappalli in January 2015, a month after his death. Balachander later used the song "Punnagai Mannan" as the title for his 1986 film of the same name.

References

Bibliography

External links 
 

1960s Tamil-language films
1969 films
Best Tamil Feature Film National Film Award winners
Films directed by K. Balachander
Films scored by V. Kumar
Films with screenplays by K. Balachander
Indian drama films
Indian films based on plays
Polygamy in fiction
Tamil films remade in other languages
1969 drama films